Oan Kim (born April 2, 1974, in Paris, France) is a French photographer, video artist, and musician. Recent solo shows include Digital After Love (Paris), Street Life (Seoul), Life on Loop (Paris), De Paso en la Tierra (Sevilla and Madrid), White Box (New York).

Kim is currently represented by Agence Myop. He studied photography at the École nationale supérieure des Beaux-Arts followed by musical composition at the Conservatoire National Supérieur de Musique et de Danse de Paris (CNSMDP).

Over the years, Kim's photographic work has developed an approach to the medium that is neither strictly documentary, nor purely conceptual, re-questioning the balance of these elements with each new series he produces.

Kim has had more than a dozen gallery and museum solo exhibitions since 2000 in Paris, New York, Los Angeles, Seoul, and Macao, and has taken part in many group shows around the world.

In 2009, he published Je suis le chien Pitié by Actes Sud in collaboration with Laurent Gaudé.

In 2018, he released Digital After Love with Actes Sud.

Kim has received several grants or commissions from CNAP, FIACRE, SCAM, and Macao Museum of Art. In 2018 he won the Prix Swiss Life from the Fondation Swiss Life for his work on the project Digital After-Love, que restera-t-il de nos amours ?.

His musical projects are represented by ARTWORK RECORDS and PIAS.

He is the son of French-Korean painter Kim Tschang Yeul.

Solo shows and projects

2021

Film: "The Man Who Paints Waterdrops": 

Official Selection, Doc NYC. 

Official Selection, Hot Docs International Documentary Festival.

Official Selection, DMZ Film Festival, South Korea.

Official Selection, Doclisboa.

Official Selection, DocsBarcelona.

Official Selection, Tel Aviv International Documentary Film Festival.

Silver Prize, 61st Krakow Documentary Film Festival. 

2019

Street Life, Galerie Baudoin Lebon

Digital After Love, Galerie Iman Farès

2018

Digital After Love, Cité de la musique, Paris

2013 

Kim Kim Gallery, Douglasism, Amado Art Space, Seoul

Nuits Photographiques, Bain de Foule, Prix du Festival, festival du film photographique, Arles

2012

Nuits Photographiques, Bain de Foule, Prix du Festival, festival du film photographique, Paris

2011

White Box, New York

Galerie La Petite Poule Noire, Paris

The McKinney Contemporary, Dallas

Musée Whanki, Seoul

2010 

Galerie La Petite Poule Noire, Paris

2009

Rencontres Photographiques d’Arles, programme du Méjan, Le Capitole, Arles

Pyo Gallery LA, Los Angeles, USA

2008 

Pyo Gallery, Seoul, Corée du Sud

2007 

Centre Culturel Coréen, Paris

2006

Macau Museum of Art, (avec Frank Lei), Macao

2005

Pyo Gallery, Seoul

The Annex, New York

2003 

SungKok Museum, Seoul

Lee Hwaik Gallery, Seoul

2002

Musée Kumho, Seoul

Galerie Hedaes Sevira, Paris

2001

SeoHwa gallery, Seoul

Group shows and projects

2020

SINE DIE, Agence Myop, Chronique en images de la vie au temps du coronavirus, L'Obs

"Sine Die", André Frère Éditions, France, 2020.

2019

Tbilissi Photo Festival, projection, Géorgie

Festival OVNi, Nice

MYOP in Arles, Rencontres Photographiques d’Arles

Take (    ) at face value, Korean Cultural Centre Australia, Sidney

Galerie Baudoin Lebon, Busan Art Fair, Busan, Corée du Sud

2018

MYOP in Arles, Rencontres Photographiques d’Arles

2016

SAM, Peter Kim, Myung-Ok Han, Oan Kim: Art-cade, Galerie des Grands Bains Douches de la Plaine, Marseille. 
Commissariat: Michel Enrici

Myop in Paris, Hotel de Sauroy, Paris

2015 

Myop in London, Galerie Seen Fifteen, Londres

2014

Site Whanki, Wave, Musée Whanki, Seoul

MYOP in Arles, Rencontres Photographiques d’Arles

Histoires, les Nuits Photographiques, Pavillon Carré de Baudoin, Paris

2013

Homage à Whanki, Musée Whanki, Seoul

Prix Arte Laguna, exposition des finalistes, Arsenale, Venise

De Paso en la Tiera, Quartiers de la création, Nantes

De Paso en la Tiera, El Ayuntamiento, Bilbao

2012

VAFA 2012 Festival, Macao

'Your invisible shadow, Kumho Museum, Seoul, Corée du Sud

De passage sur terre, Séville, Alméria, Espagne

'Via Torografica, Madrid

2011

Life On Loop, Nuit Blanche, Paris

Rencontres Photographiques d’Arles, Off, Agence Myop

Dancing to the rhyme, Kumho Museum, Seoul

Se Vende Toros, Séville

2010 

Melon Rouge Fringe Festival, Phnom Penh, Cambodge

Life On Loop, avec Jungwan Bae, Pyo Gallery LA, Los Angeles

2009

Etre jeune en France, Caixa Cultural, Rio de Janeiro, Sao Paulo, & Brasilia Brésil

Galerie Lipao-Huang, Art Show, AVIFF, Cannes

2008 

Micro Narrative, Musée d’art moderne de Saint Etienne

Mary Had a Little Lamb, Musée Sunje, Kyung Ju, Corée du Sud

2007

Micro Narrative, Oktober Salon, Belgrade, Serbie

Projection de l’agence M.Y.O.P, Rencontres photographiques d’Arles

No Where/ Now Here, IM Art Gallery, Seoul

2006 

Vanitas, Espace Sol, Seoul

KIAF, Seoul

2005

KIAF, Pyo Gallery, Seoul

2004

How do you see the future, Sungkok Art Museum, Seoul

Territoire de Jeunesse, Saint-Omer, France

Shinchon Art Festival, Seoul

2003 

Surf Culture, The Contemporary Museum, Honolulu

2000

Capitale Jeunesse », mois de la photo à Paris, Mairie du 13ème arrondissement

Visa pour l’image,  projection, Perpignan.

1998

food, shelter, clothing, Musée de la ville de Seoul, Corée du sud

Diplômés 97, ENSBA, Paris

Publications 

 , Editions Actes Sud, en collaboration avec la musicienne Ruppert Pupkin, 2019
 Je suis le chien Pitié, Editions Actes Sud, livre de photographie, avec un texte de Laurent Gaudé, 2009

Music

Oan Kim and the Dirty Jazz: Oan Kim and the Dirty Jazz, ARTWORK RECORDS [PIAS], Released on 20 January 2023.

Collections 
 Fonds National d’Art Contemporain
 Macau Art Museum
 Musée Kumho
 Musée SungKok

Prizes

 2018 : - Prix SwissLife à 4 mains
 2013 : - Bourse pour la photographie documentaire du Centre National des Arts Plastiques
 2012 : - Prix des Nuits Photographiques pour ‘Bain de foule’, festival du film photographique
 2008 : - Bourse du Centre National des Arts Plastiques pour ‘Bain de foule’
 2006 : - Résidence d’artiste au Musée de Macao
 2003 : - Prix 'Tomorrow's Artist' du Musée Sungkok, Seoul
 2001 : - Bourse du FIACRE pour ‘Oh les beaux jours’
 1999 : - Commande du Centre National des Arts Plastiques (CNAP) de la série ‘Fanfares'
 1997 : - Prix de photographie de l’ENSBA

References 

Living people
1974 births
Photographers from Paris
French video artists
Musicians  from Paris
École des Beaux-Arts alumni
Conservatoire de Paris alumni